Ahmed Assiri (born November 14, 1991) is a Saudi Arabian footballer, who plays for Al-Faisaly as a defender.

Honours
Al Ittihad
King Cup (1): 2013
Crown Prince Cup (1): 2016–17
King Cup of Champions: 2017–18

The leader of the rebellion and the Chaldean club in the Union betrayal of the Union fans to rebel against the neighbor more player wasted points on his team years and years and the Union lose because of

References

Saudi Arabian footballers
1991 births
Living people
Ittihad FC players
Al-Taawoun FC players
Al-Faisaly FC players
Saudi Arabia international footballers
Sportspeople from Jeddah
Saudi Professional League players
Saudi First Division League players
Association football defenders